Eurillas is a genus of greenbuls, passerine birds in the bulbul family Pycnonotidae.

Taxonomy
The genus Eurillas was introduced in 1899 by the American ornithologist Harry C. Oberholser with the little greenbul as the type species. The genus name combines the Ancient Greek eurus meaning "broad" or "wide" and illas meaning "thrush".

This genus was formerly synonymized with the genus Andropadus. A molecular phylogenetic study of the bulbul family published in 2007 found that Andropadus was polyphyletic. In the revision to the generic classification five species were moved from Andropadus to the resurrected genus Eurillas.

Species
The genus contains five species:

 Little greenbul (Eurillas virens)
 Yellow-whiskered greenbul (Eurillas latirostris)
 Plain greenbul (Eurillas curvirostris)
 Little grey greenbul (Eurillas gracilis)
 Ansorge's greenbul (Eurillas ansorgei)

References

Moyle, R. G., and B. D. Marks. 2006. Phylogenetic relationships of the bulbuls (Aves: Pycnonotidae) based on mitochondrial and nuclear DNA sequence data. Molecular Phylogenetics and Evolution 40: 687–695.

 
Greenbuls
 
Taxa named by Harry C. Oberholser